Joseph Arthur Coletti (November 5, 1898 - May 5, 1973) was an Italian-born American sculptor.

Life
Coletti was born in San Donato, Italy, on November 5, 1898. He was brought to the United States by his parents when he was two years old, and he was educated in public school in Quincy, Massachusetts. He then studied at the Massachusetts Art School before attending Harvard University from which he graduated in 1923. The University awarded him a fellowship to travel and study in Europe and this was followed by two years study at the American Academy in Rome.  Returning to America he studied with and assisted John Singer Sargent in his work on the Boston Public Library ceilings.

This work led Coletti into the field of architectural sculpture where much of his life’s work was done.  He was also an accomplished medalist, creating works for Harvard University. In 1963 he created the 68th issue of the Society of Medalists, Glory of God/Great Frigate Bird. He also produced numerous public portrait statues.

Coletti was a member of the National Sculpture Society and contributed several articles on sculpture for the Encyclopedia Britannica.

Coletti married Miriam Kerruish Whitney, and he had two daughters. He resided in Back Bay, Boston, where he died on May 5, 1973.

Work
 Oneida Football Club Monument, Boston Commons, in Boston, Massachusetts, 1925
 Thomas Crane Public Library, stone carvings, Quincy, Massachusetts,  1939
 Statue of David I. Walsh, Charles River Esplanade, Boston,  1954
 extensive sculptural program for Cathedral of Mary Our Queen, Baltimore, Maryland  1955-1956
 Statue of Edward Lawrence Logan, Logan International Airport, Boston,  1956
 Statue of Saint Teresa of Avila,  National Cathedral, Washington D.C., 1964

References

1898 births
1973 deaths
American architectural sculptors
American male sculptors
Artists from Boston
Harvard University alumni
National Sculpture Society members
Sculptors from Massachusetts
20th-century American sculptors
20th-century American male artists
Italian emigrants to the United States